Marin Moţ (born 9 July 1956) is a Romanian rugby union coach and former hooker.

He won 10 caps for Romania, from 1980 to 1988, scoring 2 tries, 8 points in aggregate. He was not called for the 1987 Rugby World Cup finals.

He coached Steaua București from 2004 until 2014. He won two National Champion titles in 2005/06 and 2006/07.
Moţ was hired as coach of Romania in October 2007 and was in charge until May 2008. He returned as caretaker coach in 2009, after the New Zealander Ellis Meachen had been sacked. He also coached Bucharest Wolves.

External links
Marin Moţ at ESPNscrum
Marin Moț at airugby.ro 

Living people
Romanian rugby union players
Romanian rugby union coaches
Rugby union hookers
CSA Steaua București (rugby union) players
Romania international rugby union players
Romania national rugby union team coaches
1956 births